The 3rd Royal Bavarian Chevau-légers "Duke Charles Theodore" (Königlich Bayerisches Chevaulegers-Regiment „Herzog Karl Theodor“ Nr. 3) were a light cavalry regiment of the Royal Bavarian Army. The regiment was formed in 1905 and fought in World War I. The regiment was disbanded in 1919.

See also
List of Imperial German cavalry regiments

References

Cavalry regiments of the Bavarian Army
Regiments of the German Army in World War I
Military units and formations established in 1905
Military units and formations disestablished in 1919
1905 establishments in Germany